Balsidanga is a village in Bhatar CD block in Bardhaman Sadar North subdivision of Purba Bardhaman district in the state of West Bengal, India.

The Census 2011 Balsidanga village code is 319816. The village is located in the Bhatar tehsil of Burdwan district in West Bengal, India.

Demographics
The total geographic area village is 303.52 hectares. Balsidanga features a total population of 1,340 peoples. There are about 301 houses in Balsidanga village.

Population and house data

Healthcare
Nearest Rural Hospital at Bhatar (with 60 beds) is the main medical facility in Bhatar CD block. There are primary health centres

External links
 Map
 Ratanpur

References 

Villages in Purba Bardhaman district